Diplommatina lamellata is a species of land snails with an operculum, terrestrial gastropod mollusks in the family Diplommatinidae.

This species is endemic to Palau.

References

Fauna of Palau
Diplommatina
Endemic fauna of Palau
Taxonomy articles created by Polbot